Rian McLean (born 24 April 1984) is an Australian actor. He is best known for his role on the television series Round the Twist as well as Home and Away as Christopher Fletcher.

Career
McLean made his television debut in 1991, appearing in an episode of The Flying Doctors, during the series' eighth season. He later returned to the series in the ninth and final season, playing a different role. In 1994, he made a guest appearance on the police drama series Blue Heelers, and again in 1995 when he appeared in a new role. He also appeared in the second season of the ABC children's television series Lift Off. In 2000, he made a guest appearance on children's series Pig's Breakfast. McLean later portrayed the role of Pete Twist in the ABC children's television series Round the Twist, a role for which he is best known. He was cast in the series for seasons three and the final fourth season. The role was previously played by Sam Vandenberg and Ben Thomas in season two, before the series went on hiatus in 1992 when it finished on the Seven Network, and returning in 2000. What followed was a recurring role on the Seven Network soap opera Home and Away, when McLean appeared as Christopher Fletcher, a character originally introduced in 1988; being played by different actors until 1998. McLean played the role of Christopher when the character returned in 2003, to stay with Irene Roberts (Lynne McGranger) for a short holiday. Initially getting along with Irene's foster son Nick Smith (Chris Egan) and his best friend Seb Miller (Mitch Firth), Nick begins to suspect that Christopher is hiding a secret. It is later revealed that Christopher is gay when he tries to kiss Seb. McLean has also appeared on soap opera Neighbours and Nine Network drama series Stingers.

Filmography

External links

1984 births
Living people
Australian male soap opera actors
Australian male child actors
20th-century Australian male actors
21st-century Australian male actors
Place of birth missing (living people)